Douglas William Pulman (1 January 1946 – 7 December 2011) was a New Zealand rowing coxswain.

Pulman was born in 1946 in Ngāruawāhia.

At the 1962 British Empire and Commonwealth Games, he won the gold medal as part of the men's coxed four alongside crew members Keith Heselwood, George Paterson, Hugh Smedley and Winston Stephens. Pulman competed at the 1964 Summer Olympics as part of the men's eight. He was New Zealand Olympian number 198.

Pulman died on 7 December 2011 at his home in Ngāhinapōuri.

References

1946 births
2011 deaths
New Zealand male rowers
Olympic rowers of New Zealand
Rowers at the 1964 Summer Olympics
Rowers at the 1962 British Empire and Commonwealth Games
Commonwealth Games gold medallists for New Zealand
Commonwealth Games medallists in rowing
Coxswains (rowing)
People from Ngāruawāhia
Sportspeople from Waikato
Medallists at the 1962 British Empire and Commonwealth Games